Ali Hasan Kamal  (born March 7, 1986) is an Iraqi midfielder .

News were circulated on November 2012 that Zico called him to the formation against Jordan.

External links
 Player's profile on Goalzz.com

1986 births
Living people
Iraqi footballers
Iraqi expatriate footballers
Iraq international footballers
Al Kharaitiyat SC players
Qatar SC players
Al-Khor SC players
Zakho FC players
Qatar Stars League players
Iraqi Premier League players
Association football midfielders